Domsiah (also spelled domesiah) is an Iranian variety of rice. It is a long-grain rice, with a black spot on one end, which gives it the name, which is Persian meaning "black end".  It is cultivated mainly in the Gilan province of Iran.

Domsiah rice is related to basmati rice.

Domsiah is especially valued for its aroma, which is more expressed than other basmati-type rices, and for its ability to end up as a fluffy, flaky and very light but tasty substance as basis for other ingredients of a meal.

Research is trying to develop High Yielding Varieties (HYV) which could eventually replace Domsiah and help farmers obtain 5-7 tons per hectare; however, on the Iranian market quality goes before quantity so farmers can earn more money by cultivating Domsiah yielding only 2 –  2.5 tons per hectare.

Researchers and scientists have not succeeded in bringing forth varieties which are resistant to fungi and stem borer and still have the aroma of Domsiah and the other related local aromatic rice varieties, of which the most popular besides Domsiah are Tarom Hashemi, Binam, Hasani, Salari, Ambarboo and Sang Tarom and Hasan Sarai.
More than 80% of the rice area in Iran are under these varieties.

These varieties are all characterized by a tall stature, 125 – 135 cm., a 
weak culm and droopy leaves. They have a long slender grain and a head rice 
recovery of 60-63%. They have medium amylose content (AC, a determinant 
of eating quality) and good aroma and elongation qualities.

Diseases and shortcomings

Domsiah and the other rice varieties have droopy leaves and a weak culm and are therefore prone to loding (falling down on the ground). They are susceptible to blast (fungi) and stem borer (insects).

See also
Oryza sativa

References

Rice varieties
Iranian cuisine
Agriculture in Iran
Persian words and phrases